Anton Doll was born the son of a teacher in Munich on 3 March, 1826 (1826-1887) was a German painter and was a member of the Munich Kunstverein.

References

1826 births
1887 deaths
German painters